This is a list of radio stations in Nelson and Tasman, New Zealand.

Most stations in Nelson and Tasman are based in Nelson.

FM & AM stations

Low power FM stations

References

Nelson and Tasman
Radio stations in Nelson
Radio stations in Tasman